A hand mold is a simple mold used for low quantity work. It is used in the injection molding and the printing industry.
It is made by a hand injection molding machine. It is a simple machine which contains a barrel, handle, nozzle, mold and heaters.

Printing
In the printing industry, a hand mold specifically refers to a two-part mold used for casting hand-made type. Inside the mold is a matrix.

In particular, it refers to a system for casting movable type, pioneered by Johannes Gutenberg, which was widely used in the early era of printing in Europe (15th-16th century).

In this method, the type was made by punching a letter-shaped cavity in a matrix made of some soft metal (typically copper).  Then this matrix would be held in the lower part of the mold, the upper part would close on it, and molten type metal would be poured into the cavity.  Using the hand mold, the printer could quickly make any additional type he might need.

Injection molding
In injection molding, hand molds refer to simple molds that have no provision for heat, cooling, or ejection. This means when a hand mold is cycled universal heating plates are required to warm the molds and the molds must be removed after each cycle to remove the moldings. This drastically increases the cycle time, which limits it to short runs, but to offset this is the low cost of the mold. They are usually single cavity molds, but may be multi-cavity if the molding is quite small. They are usually only of a two or three plate design because of the simplicity of the parts. If only a short run is required then the molds may be made from aluminum or brass, but if more parts are required then they are made from conventional steels.

Bullet casting
Hand cast bullets remain popular with the handloading, muzzleloading and small custom ammunition loading communities. In a tradition dating back to the beginning of firearms, molds matched to the bore (and the chamber for breech loading weapons) are custom made for each weapon. Anywhere from one to six cavities are carved into the molding block, along with appropriate gates and sprues. As the blocks are now usually made out of aluminum, which does not allow lead alloys to stick, only a small amount of parting compound is needed.

References

Casting (manufacturing)
Plastics industry
Printing terminology
Typography